Sandra Force is a flight attendant and former elementary school teacher who won the Miss Tennessee USA pageant in 1968.

Originally from Memphis, Tennessee, Force represented Tennessee in the Miss USA 1968 pageant held in Miami Beach, Florida. She placed in the semi-finals for the national title. Force graduated from Mississippi College in 1968 with a bachelor's degree in art and education then moved to Dallas, Texas.

Force left her job as a Dallas school teacher in 1971 to join Southwest Airlines as one of its original flight attendants. She appeared on the cover of Esquire Magazine in February 1974. , Force was one of five original flight attendants still working for Southwest.

References

External links

Miss Tennessee USA official website

Year of birth missing (living people)
Living people
Flight attendants
Miss Tennessee USA winners
Miss USA 1960s delegates
Mississippi College alumni
People from Memphis, Tennessee
Southwest Airlines people